Kevin Webster is a fictional character from the British ITV soap opera Coronation Street. Portrayed by Michael Le Vell, the character first appeared on-screen during the episode airing on 19 October 1983. Le Vell was suspended from the soap in February 2013 due to allegations of sexual offences, with scenes he had already filmed cut from broadcast. Le Vell was found not guilty of all charges in September 2013, and briefly returned in early 2014, before taking another 3-month break from the show and returning once again.

Kevin is protective of his two daughters Rosie Webster (Emma Collinge, Helen Flanagan) and Sophie Webster (Ashleigh Middleton, Emma Woodward, Brooke Vincent) and their mother Sally Webster (Sally Dynevor). His notable storylines have seen him have an on-and-off relationship and marriage with Sally, his affairs with Natalie Horrocks (Denise Welch) and Molly Dobbs (Vicky Binns), the latter of which resulted in the birth of his son Jack (Kyran Bowes) and subsequent second divorce from Sally. Kevin has since embarked on a romance with Jenny Bradley (Sally Ann Matthews). The relationship ended in 2015 after she kidnapped Jack.

More recently, his storylines have focused on him caring for Jack after he was diagnosed with sepsis, requiring foot amputation and helping him with treatment.

Storylines
Kevin arrives in Weatherfield in 1983, moving in with Hilda Ogden (Jean Alexander) as her lodger. He gets a job as a mechanic at Brian Tilsley's (Christopher Quinten) garage. His father, Bill (Peter Armitage), and sister, Debbie (Sue Devaney), soon follow. Kevin stays in Weatherfield after Bill remarries and he and Debbie move down to Southampton in January 1985. Kevin builds up a mother-son relationship with Hilda.

Kevin becomes good friends with Terry Duckworth (Nigel Pivaro), who sets him up on a blind date with Michelle Robinson (Stephanie Tague) in May 1985. The two start dating and Kevin loses his virginity to her but after pressuring her constantly for sex, Michelle ends the relationship in July. Kevin is single until January 1986 when he meets Sally Seddon (Sally Dynevor) after accidentally splashing her whilst driving by in his work van. Their romance is often strained, due to Hilda's interference, as she feels that Kevin is too good for Sally and Sally is loyal to her family, who treat her badly. Kevin proposes repeatedly but Sally only accepts after Kevin risks his life saving Bet Lynch (Julie Goodyear) from a fire in 1986. They finally marry in October 1986.

The following year, Hilda leaves Weatherfield after selling the house to Kevin and Sally and Kevin continues to work at the garage after Brian is murdered. After a lot of persuasion from Sally, he buys it in 1996 and goes into partnership with Tony Horrocks (Lee Warburton). Kevin and Sally have two daughters: Rosie (Helen Flanagan) and Sophie (Brooke Vincent). However, their happiness doesn't last as Kevin has an affair with Natalie Horrocks (Denise Welch), mother of Tony. Originally, their affair is no strings attached but Natalie falls for Kevin and wants him permanently. As a result, she gets careless so Sally discovers Kevin's infidelity but forgives him; however, they separate after Sally has an affair with Greg Kelly (Stephen Billington). They divorce in 1999 and Kevin refuses to allow Sally to take the girls back to live with her. She gave him residency while she found somewhere for her and the girls to live. Kevin learns that Greg was violent towards Sally in front of Rosie and Sophie but she is still awarded custody.

Later that year, Kevin starts dating factory worker Alison Wakefield (Naomi Radcliffe), but she leaves him when it becomes clear that he is still in love with Sally. However, upon discovering that she is pregnant, they reconcile and marry in January 2000 with Kevin's daughters, Roy (David Neilson) and Hayley Cropper (Julie Hesmondhalgh), Linda Sykes (Jacqueline Pirie) and Ashley Peacock (Steven Arnold) present. Their happiness doesn't last, however, when their newborn son Jake dies from a Group B streptococcal infection. The tragedy distresses Alison so much that she snatches Sarah-Louise Platt's (Tina O'Brien) newborn daughter, Bethany (Emily & Amy Walton), and commits suicide after giving baby Bethany to Kevin, leaving him devastated.

In the following months, Kevin dates Molly Hardcastle (Jacqueline Kingston), a nurse he meets through his friend, Martin Platt (Sean Wilson), whom he helps reconsider committing suicide when he learns that she is financial trouble. He ends the relationship when he realises that he is still in love with Sally and disrupts her wedding to Danny Hargreaves, telling him that he and Sally had a one night stand the night before he married Alison. Danny is disgusted and jilts Sally at the altar, leaving her devastated. As 2002 approaches, Kevin is determined to win Sally back and eventually convinces her to marry him again, although she warns him that it is only for their daughters' sakes. However, while engaged to Kevin, Sally has a brief fling with Alex, a painter, and decorator, which is revealed on their wedding day. Sally has to decide who she wants to be with and chooses Kevin, who has already forgiven her for her fling with Alex, and they remarry on 9 December 2002. During the following years, Kevin continues to work at the garage and becomes a brotherly figure to employee Tyrone Dobbs (Alan Halsall). He also becomes good friends with his employee Tommy Harris (Thomas Craig), and they save Gail Hillman (Helen Worth) and her children, Sarah and David (Jack P. Shepherd) when her husband Richard Hillman (Brian Capron) tries to kill them in the Weatherfield canal in March 2003. Kevin is distraught when he discovers Tommy's body in the garage in March 2005 after he has been murdered by his daughter, Katy (Lucy-Jo Hudson). That same year sees Sally become a pushy parent, much to Kevin and Rosie's distress. She enrols Rosie into the prestigious Oakhill School after Rosie shows good potential at maths and forces Kevin to work longer hours so they can keep her there. Sally also starts working for car dealer Ian Davenport (Philip Bretherton), whose daughter, Gemma, is one of Rosie's friends at Oakhill. Sally and Ian have an affair later in 2005, which Rosie discovers when she walks in on them. When Kevin finds out, he is devastated and decides to end the marriage but Rosie persuades him not to, convincing him that Sally does love him and is only having the affair so that she can pay her tuition fees.

In 2007, Kevin is worried that Sally is having another affair, this time with teacher John Stape (Graeme Hawley). This transpires as John is tutoring Sally in A-level English. John's girlfriend Fiz Brown (Jennie McAlpine) thinks the same but when she confronts Sally on Christmas Day 2007, Kevin, Sally and Fiz are stunned to learn that John is, in fact, having an affair with Rosie. Kevin severely beats John in the street and is subsequently arrested for assault, being sentenced to 28 days imprisonment. However, he only serves 14 days for good behaviour.

Kevin begins feuding with businessman Tony Gordon (Gray O'Brien) during July 2008, who manipulates Rosie into helping him persuade Kevin to sell him the garage. Kevin refuses but Tony invests in Kevin again, this time with Jimmy Dockerson (Robert Beck), Kevin responds angrily but forgets about Jimmy until he realises he is losing clients. He confronts the specific garage mechanic alone with Jimmy before confronting Tony about the situation, although Sally and Rosie deny Kevin's proof. Kevin later discovers that his tow truck has been stolen whilst helping a woman fix her car on a call-out. Although he has no proof, he knows that Tony is responsible and finds out that Rosie is giving Tony business documents from the garage. He is furious that she has betrayed him like that, even though she thought she was actually helping him with his ailing business. He gives half the business to Tyrone as an incentive to help him rebuild the business. As a result of his ploy to stop Tony from gaining control of it, Kevin is now a co-owner. Rosie later disappears, leaving Sally and Kevin distraught. They initially think that she has run off with lottery winnings from the Underworld syndicate until Janice Battersby (Vicky Entwistle) admits that she stole Rosie's identity and used it to claim the money. Sally and Kevin receive a postcard from Rosie, which leads them to believe that she is in Holyhead and Sally goes there, searching for her to no avail. Kevin and Sally are reunited with Rosie on 5 November 2008, when Fiz discovers that John Stape had abducted her. Kevin threatens John but is restrained by a detective.

In 2009, Kevin becomes attracted to Molly Dobbs (Vicky Binns), wife of his business partner and best friend, Tyrone. Molly begins to help Sally with the book-keeping and spends more time with Kevin. Eventually, he tells Molly that he has feelings for her but she is initially horrified and slaps Kevin but later admits that she is flattered. They begin an affair, first sleeping together when Kevin sneaks away from Sally's birthday party in July 2009. Afterwards, Kevin feels guilty and decides to end the fling by persuading Tyrone to take Molly on holiday but it resumes in August. They soon admit that they love each other and plan to start a new life together. However, Kevin keeps finding reasons not to tell Sally, including Sophie's baptism and her GCSEs. On Christmas Day, Kevin and Molly agree that they will tell their respective partners then but Sally drops a bombshell of her own - she has breast cancer. Kevin makes it to Molly's house before she tells Tyrone, telling her that Sally has cancer and that he intends to support her, ending their relationship. However, he has to talk to Molly as she discovers that she is four months pregnant and isn't sure who the father is. Kevin, however, refuses to have anything to do with her and suggests she have a termination but Tyrone is thrilled and convinces Molly to let him look after her. Hurt by Kevin's behaviour, Molly agrees.

In August 2010 at Roy and Hayley's wedding, Claire Peacock (Julia Haworth) tells the Street that she caught Sophie and her best friend, Sian Powers (Sacha Parkinson), kissing a few days before but Kevin and Sally don't believe her. Sophie admits the truth to her shocked father that night, that she and Sian are in love. Kevin is supportive but the girls decide to run away together, much to Kevin and Sally's devastation. They are later reunited with her after Rosie tracks her down to Sheffield and brings them home. On 6 December, Kevin is knocked down by the explosion in the Joinery and derails a tram that smashes into the corner shop, crushing Molly, who is inside with baby Jack and Sunita Alahan (Shobna Gulati). He and Tyrone try to free Molly but they are pulled away by the emergency services. Sally sits with Molly to comfort her as she is dying and she tells Sally that Kevin is baby Jack's father. Sally is devastated and Kevin admits it so she throws him out and he returns to the hospital to see how Jack is doing. When Jack is discharged, Tyrone asks for Kevin and Sally for help to look after him. However, Sally goes out, unable to face Jack but Kevin finds her and tries to convince her that he still loves her. Sally tells him that she wants him to leave for good. Later, in the Rovers, he meets Bill and Pam. Pam expresses her grief at Molly's death and makes it clear she blames Kevin as she does not know how to tell Molly's father, Diggory Compton (Eric Potts). The funeral is arranged for 17 December 2010 and during the service, Tyrone breaks down while giving his eulogy and Kevin takes over but Sally leaves the church, disgusted. Unfortunately, this and seeing Kevin and Sally argue arouses Tyrone's suspicions. At the graveside, Tyrone realises that Kevin is Jack's father and attacks him at the graveside, making him fall into the grave on top of Molly's coffin. Later, Sally, Rosie, and Sophie insist that Kevin leave, despite his pleas for forgiveness. Kevin spends the night in the garage and goes home the next day, barging in and refuses to leave until Sally threatens to call the police and have him arrested. Sophie begs her not to and Sally agrees to let Kevin stay that night, providing that he stay away from her. The next day, Tyrone gives baby Jack to Kevin, much to Sally and Rosie's disgust and Rosie moves out. On Christmas Eve, Sally tells Kevin that watching him with Jack makes her hate him even more and she wants them out. He asks Tyrone to take Jack back but he refuses so Kevin moves out, but after a desperate plea from Sophie, Sally allows Kevin to stay for Christmas Day.

On New Year's Eve, Kevin accepts the fact that Jack is his son and that his family doesn't want him around. He leaves Coronation Street, returning a week later only to find Tyrone leaving his house and confronts him. Sally tells Kevin that her life is no longer his business, making Kevin and Tyrone fight. Kevin tells Sally that he is filing for divorce and is putting the house on the market. Kevin and Sally agree a truce but when Kevin suggests they reconcile and raise Jack together, Sally refuses and this leads to a feud between them as he shows buyers around the house but Sally and neighbour, Eddie Windass (Steve Huison) put them off. That week, Rosie tells Kevin that she wants to get to know Jack better and offers to babysit but actually uses him for a modelling audition but brings the wrong baby home, angering Kevin. He returns the other child and collects Jack from the studio, telling Rosie to stay away and ignores her until her boss, Alfie, Sally's new boyfriend, Jeff Cullen (Steven Houghton), fires her. Kevin supports her and offers to punch Alfie but the arguing upsets Sophie so she gets drunk and believing that her life is falling apart, falls off the church roof. Sally blames Kevin and they argue again until Sian interrupts, telling them that they are both responsible for Sophie's accident. Although unhappy at what Sian has said, they accept this and call a truce. Sally invites him to the house for the evening and allows Kevin to hug her but he gets the wrong impression and tries to kiss her so she asks him to leave.

On the day that Kevin and Sally meet to finalise their divorce, Kevin wins £200,000 on a scratch card but keeps it secret. Tyrone, however, tells Sally just as she is about to sign. On hearing this, Sally refuses to sign and demands £100,000. The following week, Sally receives some flowers from Kevin and he also buys Sally a new car but she sells it and keeps the money before getting the lottery money frozen until a court hearing can be arranged. However, the judge rules in Kevin's favour as Sally loses her temper when Kevin's lawyer reminds her of her affair with Ian Davenport but he later gives the entire £200,000 to Sally, after Bill encourages him to do whatever is necessary to win Sally back. After talking to Gail, she returns half of the winnings to him for Jack and they call a truce. When Jeff reveals he is taking Sally to Paris for a fortnight and gloats in front of Kevin, Sally apologises for Jeff's attitude and they remember their wedding anniversary trip to Paris five years before. Kevin bids Sally farewell and they part on good terms.

In May 2011, Kevin and Tyrone's feuding at the garage turns violent after Tyrone, in a fit of rage, damages a new hydraulic lift that Kevin has bought. Kevin is crushed under a car he is working on when it gives way and is saved by Tyrone and Tommy Duckworth (Chris Fountain). When Tyrone admits he damaged the lift, Kevin forgives him and they call a truce so they can work together. Sally returns from Paris that day and asks Kevin and Jack to stay with her until his injuries heal and he agrees. One day in June, he isn't happy to see Sophie and Sian giving money to Ken Barlow's (William Roache) grandson, James Cunningham (James Roache), when the soup kitchen is reportedly burgled. He bans them from the kitchen and is surprised when Sally backs him up but Sophie ignores them and starts working there as a manager. Kevin softens and supports the charity auction held at the bistro. The following day, Kevin gets the all-clear about his collarbone and is shocked when Sophie asks him to loan her £20,000 so the charity can buy the house they've been renting. After Kevin refuses, Sophie hacks into his bank account and transfers £20,000 to the charity. Meanwhile, Sally and Kevin's relationship is improving as Sally doesn't ask Kevin to return to his flat and they have stopped arguing. However, the next day, Sophie and Sian are horrified to learn that the charity never bid for the house and that the soup kitchen is being demolished, with builders insisting it hasn't been occupied for months. Failing to find the charity leaders, Rob and Janet, Sophie and Sian realise that they've lost £20,000. Forced to confess, she tells Kevin, who angrily confronts James, who insists he knows nothing about the scam and is supported by the Barlow family, except Tracy Barlow (Kate Ford), who has suspicions. Kevin calls the police but tells them that he transferred the cash, ending the tension in the Webster home. A few days later, Kevin learns that the two con artists behind the charity scam have been arrested and tells Sally. James panics, realising that the truth will come out; he attacks Ken and flees Weatherfield. Ken tells the Websters what has happened and Kevin tells the police. In September, Kevin learns that Tyrone has a new girlfriend, Kirsty Soames (Natalie Gumede), a police officer he met in a bar. Tommy admits to Kevin he paid Kirsty to flirt with Tyrone and Kevin insists Tommy tell Tyrone the truth.

During September, Kevin learns that his sister Debbie has bought a villa in Turkey and plans to take Jack there. However, he learns that to change Jack's birth certificate, he'll have to apply for parental responsibility. Ken, who has experience of adoption, warns him that he should discuss it with Tyrone. Tyrone angrily tells Kevin to do whatever he wants. The next day, Bill and Pam visit Kevin and tell him that they are engaged but Pam is appalled to learn that Kevin is still living with Sally and plans to change Jack's surname. This prompts Sally, to ask Kevin to leave and he reluctantly agrees. Kevin and Pam argue and she bans him from the wedding whilst he bans her from seeing Jack. Bill collapses, suffering a heart attack, and is taken to hospital, but the arguing continues until Sally stops them. Sally ends the relationship the next day after she hears Kevin telling Sophie that they are back together. Wanting to prove Kevin wrong, she resumes her relationship with Jeff, much to Rosie and Sophie's disgust. Over the coming weeks, Kevin accepts Sally has moved on and decides to stop trying to win her back and in October, they are back on good terms as proved when Sophie announces she and Sian are engaged. Kevin refuses to give his permission for their marriage and Sally agrees, but next day, Kevin and Rosie's boyfriend Jason Grimshaw (Ryan Thomas) are concerned when Rosie goes missing again after viewing a flat and learn that it is next to The Kabin. They kick the door down and find Rosie tied up, John having kidnapped her again because he is coaching her to be a witness for Fiz at her trial. John escapes but Kevin goes after him, leaving Jason to look after Rosie. As he tells a horrified Sally, John races past them in his car and Kevin chases him, resulting in a car chase that ends when John crashes his car into a truck trailer. The next day, as Rosie gives her statement, she thanks her dad for rescuing her and Kevin is the hero of the Webster family. When John dies, Kevin has to stop Sally from going to see Fiz being sentenced, because she belittles Fiz's friends and family for supporting a murderer. He defends her in The Rovers when Julie Carp (Katy Cavanagh) attacks Sally for her comments. Later in the week, Sophie celebrates her 17th birthday. However, this is overshadowed when Kevin reads an article in the Gazette about Rosie's second kidnapping, as well as insensitive comments about Sally's cancer, Kevin's affair, baby Jack and about Sophie's sexuality. Kevin and Sally are furious with Rosie, and they throw Jeff out when they learn he convinced Rosie to write the article. Sophie's birthday is celebrated by Kevin with a firework display. In personal terms, Kev and Sal are on good terms again.

Towards the end of 2011, Sophie and Sian announce their intention to have a civil partnership. Kevin and Sally come round to the idea and a date is set for late December. However, Kevin learns from Sunita that Sophie has been having doubts, and he tries unsuccessfully to talk her out of it. Later, during the ceremony, Kevin feels his fears are well-founded when Sophie stumbles through her vows and tells her that she didn't have to go through with it, causing a massive row between Sophie and Sian; the ceremony is abandoned. That evening Sian leaves Sophie for good and Kevin is guilt-stricken over his part in the break-up. Sophie tells him that she will never speak to him again. Sally and Rosie are sympathetic, knowing Kevin didn't do it out of spite. Soon Kevin learns that Sally is dating Frank Foster (Andrew Lancel), who is awaiting trial for raping Carla Connor (Alison King). Kevin had doubts about Frank's past and wanting the truth from Sally, he is forced to tell Sophie but Sally accuses Kevin of trying to interfere in their relationship and retaliates by telling him that she will file for divorce the next day. Sophie rejects him again when she asks Dennis Tanner (Philip Lowrie) to fix a leak in the kitchen - stating that she would "much rather drown than speak to my dad again", though Rita suggests Kevin give it time and Sophie will realise that she was wrong but she adopts Frank as father figure, to Kevin's growing disgust. However, he did achieve one good thing: he started repairing his friendship with Tyrone as Kirsty had just learned that she was pregnant and Tyrone wasn't sure if he wanted to be with her. Upon learning on Kirsty's pregnancy, Kevin congratulated Tyrone and the two shook hands. This persuaded Tyrone to stay with her and started Kevin and Tyrone's healing relationship.

After Frank was cleared of raping Carla, he made plans for Underworld's future and cheated on Sally with business associate, Jenny Sumner (Niky Wardley). When Sally confronted him, Frank admitted raping Carla and threatened Sally. This infuriated Kevin, who vowed to kill Frank. When Sally finds Frank dead and becomes a suspect, Frank's mother, Anne (Gwen Taylor), is revealed to be responsible. Horrified, Sally tries to escape but trips, hits her head and is knocked unconscious. She is rushed to hospital following a tense standoff between Anne, Kevin, and Carla. At the hospital, whilst waiting for Sally to emerge from her coma, Sophie thanks Kevin for stopping the civil partnership. A few days later, Sally returns from hospital and admits she is grateful to Kevin. In February 2013, Kevin helps Tyrone escape with his daughter behind Kirsty Soames' back. Kevin is later questioned by the police. In late March, Sally tells the neighbours that Kevin has had to leave because his father is ill and Pam cannot cope on her own.

On Monday 17 March, Sally announces that Bill has recovered and that Kevin will be returning later in the week, with his son Jack. The following day, he phones his house tenants Stella Price (Michelle Collins), Eva Price (Catherine Tyldesley) and Leanne Battersby (Jane Danson). Eva moves out to live with her boyfriend Jason, leaving a spare bedroom for Kevin and Jack. Kevin arrives in a taxi, while Rita Sullivan (Barbara Knox) invites him into The Kabin for a cup of tea and a chat. When Kevin and Jack are inside Rita's flat, Sophie's friend Maddie Heath (Amy James-Kelly) steals one of their bags with their iPod, camera and Jack's clothes inside. Kevin later spots a man in Sally's house, who turns out to be her boyfriend Tim Metcalfe (Joe Duttine). Mistaking Tim for a burglar, Kevin attacks him, but Sally turns up and reveals who he is. Kevin later goes to visit Tyrone who invites him and Jack to stay at his house until Stella and Leanne find somewhere else. Kevin then returns to work full-time at the garage.

In 2015, Kevin embarks on a romantic relationship with an old friend Jenny Bradley (Sally Ann Matthews). They go on a few dates and Kevin invites her back to his for a nightcap but Jenny is reluctant to return to Coronation Street for fear of seeing her former foster mother, Rita. Jenny eventually returns to the Street. Rita struggles to forgive Jenny but they begin to get along. Eventually, Jenny moves into Kevin's house and the pair engage in a serious relationship. Kevin's daughter, Sophie, disapproves of the relationship and suspects Jenny of plotting something. Jenny starts to bond with Kevin's son Jack. In May 2015, it is discovered that Jenny previously had a son, who died when he drowned in a paddling pool; Jenny blames herself for the accident. Jenny plans to leave Kevin, taking Jack with her. She calls for a taxi and puts on a wig, using the name of "Melanie Davies", arranging to rent a flat in Hull. Jenny is discovered by Sophie's girlfriend, Maddie, but leaves for Hull with Jack. When Kevin and Sophie realise that Jack is missing, they travel to Hull, with Rita, to find Jenny is on the balcony with Jack. Rita talks Jenny down and she is taken away by the police and sectioned.

In August 2015, Kevin decides to expand his garage business. Kevin's ex-wife, Sally is impressed with his entrepreneurial spirit and encourages him. When the factory where Sally works comes up for sale, she persuades Kevin to help her buy it. Kevin and Sally later kiss, but Sally is engaged to Tim Metcalfe (Joe Duttine), and they agree to keep it between them. Kevin and Sally's daughter, Sophie, senses an atmosphere, and Sally eventually confesses that she kissed Kevin but says it was a mistake. Sally's next-door neighbour, Anna Windass (Debbie Rush) overhears Sally and Sophie discussing the matter. A few weeks later, when Anna is drunk at The Rovers Return Inn, she tells Tim that Kevin and Sally recently kissed. As a result, Sally and Tim split up, putting Kevin and Tim's friendship in jeopardy. Kevin and Tim are reconciled but Tim at first refuses to forgive Sally; they eventually marry. A few months later, Kevin is devastated to learn that his best mate Tyrone's step-daughter has cancer. He tries his best to support Tyrone and says he can take as much time off as he needs. Kevin also decides to give his daughter Sophie 21% of his new business for her 21st birthday.

Kevin meets a woman called Joanne (Martha Cope) on a singles night and they start dating. However, Kevin has doubts about her and it soon becomes clear that he has feelings for Anna and the pair kiss. Anna then helps Kevin separate from Joanne by pretending to get pregnant by him. Kevin and Anna start dating but agree to wait before going public. Tim sees them together in the back of a taxi, and Sally and Sophie soon find out. Kevin gets a job with Pat Phelan (Connor McIntyre), but Anna is unhappy as Phelan had previously blackmailed her into sleeping with him. Anna warns Kevin, but Phelan lies to him. Anna refuses to let Phelan affect their relationship. After she smashes Phelan's van Kevin breaks up with her but catches Phelan threatening her. She tells him about how Phelan blackmailed her. Anna and Kevin go out for tea and meet Phelan and his new girlfriend Eileen Grimshaw (Sue Cleaver). Kevin tricks Phelan by ordering a bottle of wine.

On 16 May 2016, Tim goes to Blackpool with Kevin and Jack. Sally and Sophie follow and see Tim and Kevin through a café window. Sally confronts them while Jack disappears. Jenny, who is also in Blackpool, sees Jack and runs after him. Kevin sees Jack run out in front of a tram, but Jenny pushes him out of the way just in time. Although Sally and Sophie make accusations, Kevin thanks Jenny for saving Jack's life. In October 2016, Kevin and Anna decide to move in together. However, after helping in freeing Gary and Lily Platt from under David's crashed car, Anna is engulfed in flames when a fireball from the car strikes her. Kevin and Nick Tilsley (Ben Price) are able to extinguish the flames before Anna is taken to hospital. Later, when Anna is made homeless, she moves in with Kevin. In early June 2018, Anna leaves Weatherfield after she stabbed enemy Pat Phelan in the viaduct bistro, leaving him to die. This leaves Kevin heart-broken but he soon gets over it. Later that month, Rosie leaves claiming she needs to find herself. In the following month, when Sophie is looking after Jack, he falls over and hurts his knee. Sophie takes him home but thinks nothing of it. Then, he starts to claim it is in pain and they soon come to discover that his leg needs to be amputated. Kevin is shocked by this news and struggles to come to terms with the fact that his son will now only have one leg. As Sophie feels guilty for not realising that Jack wasn’t well, she tries to help by finding a way to get Jack his treatment in Liverpool, Kevin finds it all too sudden and rejects her attempts. Over the next couple of months, Kevin starts to struggle as he has to support Jack.

Creation

Casting
Actor Michael Le Vell auditioned for the role and landed the part after he had played another character called Neil Grimshaw, a newspaper delivery boy who worked at The Kabin.

Characterisation
Kevin is very much a family man and looks out for them. ITV publicity say of the character: "A no-nonsense garage mechanic who likes an uncomplicated life and his tea on the table when he comes home from work.". In the book 'Life in The Street' by Graeme Kay, Kevin is described as a very cheerful yet cautious character.

Development

Background
Kevin is the son of Bill (Peter Armitage) and Alison Webster. Kevin's mother died of cancer when he was just 15 years old and this experience traumatised him. He first appears in 1983, as an apprentice mechanic working for Brian Tilsley (Chris Quinten). His father Bill and his younger sister, Debbie (Sue Devaney), later join him. Initially his life consists of working by day and drinking with friends Terry Duckworth (Nigel Pivaro) and Curly Watts (Kevin Kennedy) in the evening. He dates Mandie Whitworth, a friend of Terry's girlfriend and Michelle Robinson and meets his long term love interest, Sally Seddon (Sally Dynevor), in 1986 and they later marry. The Websters buy Number 13 from Hilda Ogden (Jean Alexander) after she leaves to work as a doctor's housekeeper.

Relationship with Sally Seddon
The characters of Kevin and Sally had a lack of storylines in their first years on the show but received a boost when Brian Park became executive producer. The Independent reports him as saying "Kevin and Sally Webster had years of washing their hands and eating baked beans on toast. Michael Le Vell and Sally Dynevor (then Whittaker) were then given great storylines, including his affair with Natalie, Sally's catfight with her when she found out and the subsequent divorce".

Kevin spends his early years in the show with Sally Seddon. They marry and have two daughters, Rosie (Helen Flanagan) and Sophie (Brooke Vincent).
While Sally is away nursing her sick mother, Kevin has an affair with Natalie Horrocks (Denise Welch) mother of his business partner. Natalie has no compunction about seducing a married man. Sally angrily confronts Natalie when she learns of the affair. Kevin and Sally divorce, due to the affair, and Kevin moves in with Natalie. However, he is unhappy and ends the relationship to return to Sally.

Sally and Kevin reconcile, partly for the girls' sake. However, Sally is seduced by Greg Kelly (Stephen Billington). Kevin throws her out when he learns of the affair. Greg uses Sally's money (inherited from her mother) and abuses her. The affair ends but Kevin refuses to take her back, marrying Alison Wakefield (Naomi Radcliffe) instead. The night before the wedding, Kevin and Sally sleep together for old times' sake. This secret assignation comes out, on the day Sally is to marry Danny Hargreaves (Richard Standing). Danny calls their wedding off, angry that she had cheated on him and then lied about it.

Kevin's marriage to Alison is fraught. It is learned she had a traumatic childhood after her sibling drowned and Alison is suspected of intentionally killing her. When Alison is late returning Rosie and Sophie after an outing, Sally and Kevin, perhaps believing Alison really did murder her sibling, fear that Alison might have harmed them. Alison and the girls soon return - Alison had actually taken the girls to a photographer for portraits as a gift to Kevin. Alison is traumatised when she learns Kevin and Sally feared she might have harmed the girls. Alison later commits suicide after the death of her newborn son.

Kevin asks Sally to marry him again and she agrees, for the sake of their daughters. Sally has another affair with new boss, Ian Davenport (Philip Bretherton), in 2005. Kevin overlooks it, pretending to believe Sally's denial. In 2009, Kevin develops an attraction to Molly Dobbs (Vicky Binns), wife of his business partner and friend Tyrone Dobbs (Alan Halsall) and has an affair with her lasting until Christmas 2009.

Temporary departures
In February 2013, Michael Le Vell was accused of sexual assault allegations and Kevin was written out of the series with the explanation that he was in Germany taking care of his father Bill Webster to explain his absence. Le Vell was found not guilty in September of the same year, and entered talks to return. Kevin returned briefly in March 2014, 13 months since his last appearance,  before taking another temporary break from the show after it was revealed that Le Vell had taken cocaine during his absence.

Reception
Le Vell was nominated in the category of "Best Actor" at the 2011 British Soap Awards.

References

External links
Kevin Webster at itv.com

Coronation Street characters
Fictional mechanics
Fictional businesspeople
Television characters introduced in 1983
Male characters in television